Milang is a town and locality located in the Australian state of South Australia on the west coast of Lake Alexandrina about  south-east of the state capital of Adelaide and about  north-east of the municipal seat of Goolwa.

Milang is within the federal division of Mayo, the state electoral district of Hammond and the local government area of the Alexandrina Council.

At the 2016 census, the northern part of the locality had a population of 883, of which 761 lived in its town centre.  The southern part of Milang shared a population of 69 people with the locality of Point Sturt.

The town was surveyed in December 1853; it became a significant port on the River Murray system between 1860 and 1880. Between December 1884 and June 1970, a branch line off the Mount Barker–Victor Harbor railway ran 13.1 km (8.1 mi) from a junction at Sandergrove to Milang, mainly for freight traffic but also as a minor passenger service. The line was dismantled after its closure in 1970.

Milang played a historic role as host to the first South Australian Boy Scout camp in the summer of 1909–1910; a bronze plaque marks the location.

Milang Football Club (the Milang Panthers) compete in the Hills Football League C Grade competition.

Milang is also home to professional poker player and actor Colin Birt, who amongst other victories won the SPT Super High Roller in Victor Harbor in 2021.

Heritage listings

Milang has many 19th century buildings and some heritage-listed sites including:

 Coxe Street: 1867 Royal Salute cannon, Soldiers Memorial Park
 46-50 Coxe Street: Milang School
 22-23 Daranda Terrace: Milang Butter Factory
 Lake front: Milang jetty and hand crane
 5-7 Markland Street: Dwelling with pressed iron facade

Tourist attractions
Milang tourist attractions include fishing from the state heritage-listed jetty, the Milang Historical Society museum, the Milang Historical Walk, and boating and swimming on Lake Alexandrina.

The Milang Historical Railway Museum, opened in 1992 and located in the station building of the now-closed Milang railway line, features many old photos and railway memorabilia from the era when Milang was a significant port for the River Murray shipping trade. It has become one of Milang's major attractions with its displays of the railway-era history of the town and surrounding districts, its locomotive and carriages and, in the locomotive, a computer operated driving simulator that visitors over the age of 10 can operate.

Another railway-themed attraction is the South Australian Light Railway Centre, on the museum site, which tells the story of about 700 light railways that once operated in the state in mines, forests, wineries, munitions factories and quarries, and at jetties to transport goods from ships. It includes three historic locomotives and two section cars, displays, rolling stock models, and a model light railway that visitors can drive.

References
Notes

Citations

Towns in South Australia